The discography of Kaiser Chiefs, a British indie rock band, consists of seven studio albums, one extended play, thirteen singles, and one video album. Kaiser Chiefs were formed in 1997 in Leeds, England by classmates Nick Hodgson (drums), Nick Baines (keyboards) and Simon Rix (bass). The trio were later joined by Andrew White (guitar) and Ricky Wilson (vocals).

The group's debut album Employment was released in March 2005. Influenced by the new wave and punk rock of the late 1970s, the record enjoyed success in the United Kingdom with sales of over 2 million. The album reached number three on the UK Albums Chart in 2005, then it reclimbed the charts a year later to reach number two and certified five times platinum by the British Phonographic Industry (BPI). It produced four singles, and was shortlisted for the Mercury Prize in 2005 and nominated for "Best British Album" at the 2006 BRIT Awards. Also in 2005, the band released Enjoyment, a video album composed of music videos, live performances and interviews.

The band's second album, Yours Truly, Angry Mob, was released in February 2007. It reached number one and was certified platinum in the UK, and peaked at number forty-five in the Billboard 200 albums chart in the United States. Yours Truly, Angry Mob produced four singles, two of which reached the top twenty on the UK Singles Chart. In April 2008, the album's lead single, "Ruby", was nominated for an Ivor Novello Award for "Most Performed Title of 2007–2008". Kaiser Chiefs released their third album, Off with Their Heads, in October 2008. It reached number two in the UK, and produced two singles. In 2014, Kaiser Chiefs released their 4th album, Education, Education, Education & War. On 31 March 2014, it reached number 1 on the UK Albums Chart, marking their first number 1 since Yours Truly, Angry Mob.

Albums

Studio albums

US-only albums

Compilation albums

Extended plays

Singles

Other charting songs

Notes

Video albums

Music videos

B-sides

Other appearances
These songs have not appeared on a studio album released by Kaiser Chiefs.

References
General

 [ "Kaiser Chiefs > Discography"]. AllMusic. Retrieved 9 October 2008.

Specific

External links
Official website

Kaiser Chiefs
Discographies of British artists
Kaiser Chiefs

lt:Kaiser Chiefs diskografija